Compunetix, Inc. is a privately held corporation headquartered in Monroeville, Pennsylvania, United States, that develops multimedia multi-point telecommunications systems for audio conferencing, videoconferencing, and mission-critical applications in commercial and government markets around the world.  Founded in 1968, Compunetix now has over one million ports in more than 30 countries, making it the industry's largest worldwide deployer of teleconferencing systems.

History

Early history 
Compunetics, Inc. was founded in 1968 by Dr. Giorgio Coraluppi. Initially operating as a contract engineering firm, the company entered the printed circuit board market in 1969. For the next few decades, Compunetics worked to create custom technologies for several agencies of the United States Government.

In the 1980s, Compunetics received its first U.S. patent for a "Rearrangeable full Availability Multistage Switching Network with Redundant Conductors".  Utilizing this technology, Compunetics was able to secure a contract for NASA that entailed creating a voice control system (VSS and VSD units) that could connect up to 4,000 mission specialists around the world.  Shortly thereafter, Compunetics developed the CONTEX 240 and 480 conference bridges, which were regarded as groundbreaking conferencing platforms.

Formation 
In 1990 Compunetix, Inc. was formally created to undertake commercial and government applications of voice, video, and data conferencing technology.

Corporate structure
Compunetix is composed of five business units that collectively conceptualize, engineer and manufacture the company’s products.

Divisions

Communications Systems Divisions (CSD)
Voice and Data Collaboration Systems
 Sonexis
 Enterprise level audio and web conferencing

Video Systems Division (VSD)
Video conferencing systems

Federal Systems Division (FSD)
Mission-critical systems (aerospace, military and government clients)

Instrumentation Systems Division (ISD)
Electronics manufacturing

Wholly owned corporate subsidiaries

Compunetics
 Printed circuit board manufacturing

Products
Compunetix designs and builds hardware and software for audio, data, and video collaboration and conference systems; the company also makes command, communication, and control keysets and instruments.  Each product is built in accordance with military specifications at Compunetix in-house facilities.

Some of Compunetix's available products include:

Voice/data collaboration
Platforms
Summit Olympus
Summit Xtend X2
CONTEX Digital Record and Playback (CDRP)
Control layer
Windows Operator Console (WOC)
Maintenance Client (MC)
Passcode Server
APIs
CONTEX Automatic Conference Linking (ACL)
CONTEX Report
Applications
CONTEX Presenter
CONTEX Operator Express

Video conferencing
Platforms 
EVERGREEN
Software
Operator Console
Maintenance Client

Mission critical systems
Platforms
CONTEX 60T
CONTEX 500T
CONTEX 2000T
Mission Voice Platform (MVP)

References

External links 
 Compunetix corporate website

Privately held companies based in Pennsylvania
Telecommunications companies established in 1968
Telecommunications companies of the United States
1968 establishments in Pennsylvania
Companies based in Allegheny County, Pennsylvania
Videotelephony